"Where the River Flows" is a song by American rock band Collective Soul, appearing on the band's 1995 eponymous album. The song was released as the fifth and final single from the album. "Where the River Flows" peaked at number one on the US Billboard Mainstream Rock chart, becoming the band's fourth single to do so. The song became a top-40 hit in Canada, peaking at number 39 on the RPM 100 Hit Tracks chart.

Track listing

Charts

References

1995 songs
1996 singles
Atlantic Records singles
Collective Soul songs
Song recordings produced by Matt Serletic
Songs written by Ed Roland